Bothrocophias hyoprora, or the Amazonian toad-headed pitviper, is a species of venomous snake in the  family Viperidae. It is endemic to north-western South America.

Geographic range
It is found in Bolivia, Brazil (in the states of Acre, Amazonas, Pará, and Rondônia), Colombia, Ecuador, and Peru.

References

Further reading
 Amaral, A.P. 1935. Estudos sobre ophídios neotropicos XXXIII. Novas especies de ophídios da Colombia. Memórias do Instituto Butantan 9 : 219-223 + 1 Plate.

hyoprora
Snakes of South America
Reptiles of Bolivia
Reptiles of Brazil
Reptiles of Colombia
Reptiles of Ecuador
Reptiles of Peru
Reptiles described in 1935